Sir Walter Fleming Coutts  (30 November 1912 – 4 November 1988) was a British colonial administrator and was Uganda's final Governor before independence, from 1961–1962.  He was Governor-General of Uganda 1962–1963. He was chosen for this job because he had a reputation within the colonial office for supporting African nationalism and African independence movements.

He was educated at Glasgow Academy, the University of St Andrews and St John's College, Cambridge.

See also
 Clan Farquharson - the surname Coutts is a sept of this Scottish clan

References

1912 births
1988 deaths
People educated at the Glasgow Academy
Alumni of the University of St Andrews
Alumni of St John's College, Cambridge
Knights Grand Cross of the Order of St Michael and St George
Members of the Order of the British Empire
Governors of Uganda
Governors-General of Uganda
Governors of British Saint Vincent and the Grenadines